A list of films produced by the Bollywood film industry based in Mumbai in 1929:

1929
Notable events in Indian cinema in 1929:

Films

 Melody of Love (1928), a Universal production in English, was the first Talkie film shown in India at Elphinstone Picture Palace in Calcutta.
 Gopal Krishna directed by V. Shantaram was the first film produced under Shantaram's newly formed Prabhat Films. The film show-cased the opposition to the British rule in the guise of a "Hindu mythology" film.
 Prapancha Pash also called A Throw of Dice was directed by Franz Osten and financed by British Instructional Films Ltd. and the UFA Studios, Berlin. The film starred Himanshu Rai, Charu Roy and Seeta Devi. Devika Rani, who worked as an assistant set designer on this film, married Himanshu Rai the same year.
 Kapal Kundala directed by Priyanath N. Ganguly, was  the first Indian film to achieve a "silver jubilee" run of 25 weeks.
 Hatim Tai  directed by Prafulla Ghosh for Krishna Film Company was based on the "popular Parsi Theatre story" involving the traveller Hatim Tai and his adventures.
 Kono Vonk? also called Whose Fault? directed by Kanjibhai Rathod for Krishna Film Company, was a social film based on a story by K. M. Munshi, about a child widow marrying the lawyer who helps her.

Film Companies
Prabhat Film Company, Kolhapur, was established in partnership between V. Shantaram, V. G. Damle, Keshavrao Dhaiber, S. Fattelal and S. Kulkarni, later joined by Baburao Pai in 1939.
 Ranjit Film Company, Bombay, was founded by Chandulal Shah.
 British Dominion Films was set up by Dhiren Ganguly and P. C. Barua, with Debaki Bose as the scriptwriter.
 Aurora Film Corporation and General Pictures Corporation (Madras) were also founded in 1929.

A-D

E-I

J-K

L-N

P

Q-R

S

T-Z

References

External links
Bollywood films of 1929 at IMDb

1929
Bollywood
Films, Bollywood